Ruanda is a genus of moths in the subfamily Lymantriinae. The genus was described by Strand in 1909.

Species
Ruanda aetheria Strand, 1909
Ruanda celaenogyia (Collenette, 1936)
Ruanda eleuteriopsis Hering, 1926
Ruanda furva (Hampson, 1905)
Ruanda nuda (Holland, 1897)

References

Lymantriinae